Jessup Nash Couch (August 3, 1778 – 1821) was a lawyer in the U.S. State of Ohio who was an Ohio Supreme Court Judge 1816-1821.

Jessup Couch was born in Redding, Connecticut, and graduated from Yale University in 1802. He came to Chillicothe, Ohio from Connecticut in 1808. He was elected to represent Ross County, Ohio in the Ohio House of Representatives for the 7th General assembly, (December, 1808 – February, 1809). Couch was a trustee of Ohio University from 1809 until 1821.

Couch was appointed July 25, 1815 by Governor Thomas Worthington to fill a vacancy on the Ohio Supreme Court caused by the resignation of Thomas Scott, until the next term would start in February 1816. He was elected to a seven-year term by the legislature, beginning February 1816. He served until his death by consumption. Couch, who never married, died June 30, 1821.

Notes

References

  

People from Chillicothe, Ohio
Ohio lawyers
Yale University alumni
Justices of the Ohio Supreme Court
Ohio University trustees
Members of the Ohio House of Representatives
1778 births
1821 deaths
People from Redding, Connecticut
19th-century American lawyers